Vlková is a village and municipality in Kežmarok District in the Prešov Region of north Slovakia.

History
In historical records the village was first mentioned in 1278.

Geography
The municipality lies at an altitude of 679 metres and covers an area of 11.815 km² . It has a population of about 650 people.

External links
https://web.archive.org/web/20070513023228/http://www.statistics.sk/mosmis/eng/run.html

Villages and municipalities in Kežmarok District